More Power! is an album by saxophonist Dexter Gordon which was recorded in 1969 and released on the Prestige label.

Reception

Lindsay Planer of AllMusic states, "Dexter Gordon's return Stateside resulted in the tenor participating in his first studio sessions in nearly a decade. Not only would his April 1969 confab with James Moody (tenor sax), Barry Harris (piano), Buster Williams (bass), and Albert 'Tootie' Heath (drums) yield this long player, but its predecessor/companion The Tower of Power! as well".

Track listing 
All compositions by Dexter Gordon except as indicated
 "Lady Bird" (Tadd Dameron) – 10:38     
 "Meditation (Meditação)" (Norman Gimbel, Antônio Carlos Jobim, Newton Mendonça) – 8:27     
 "Fried Bananas" – 6:05     
 "Boston Bernie" – 7:36     
 "Sticky Wicket" – 7:02

Personnel 
Dexter Gordon – tenor saxophone
James Moody – tenor saxophone (ensemble tracks 1 & 5)
Barry Harris – piano
Buster Williams – bass
Albert Heath – drums

References 

Dexter Gordon albums
1969 albums
Prestige Records albums
Albums produced by Don Schlitten